Mets Gilanlar (also, Mets-Gilaylar, Bol’shoy Gilanlar, and Gilanlar) is a hamlet in the Ararat Province of Armenia.

See also
 Ararat Province
 Gilanlar

References 

Populated places in Ararat Province